Teodoro Palacios Flores (7 January 1939 – 17 August 2019) was a Guatemalan high jumper who competed in the 1968 Summer Olympics and won the silver medal at the 1963 Pan American Games. 
Teodoro's son is Grammy nominated American composer Marcos "Kosine" Palacios, of the production group, Da Internz.

Palacios died on 17 August 2019 at 15.10 CET in Krankenhaus Roosevelt in Guatemala.  He was 80.

References

1939 births
2019 deaths
Sportspeople from Guatemala City
Guatemalan high jumpers
Male high jumpers
Olympic athletes of Guatemala
Athletes (track and field) at the 1968 Summer Olympics
Athletes (track and field) at the 1959 Pan American Games
Athletes (track and field) at the 1963 Pan American Games
Athletes (track and field) at the 1967 Pan American Games
Pan American Games silver medalists for Guatemala
Pan American Games medalists in athletics (track and field)
Central American and Caribbean Games gold medalists for Guatemala
Competitors at the 1959 Central American and Caribbean Games
Competitors at the 1962 Central American and Caribbean Games
Competitors at the 1966 Central American and Caribbean Games
Guatemalan male athletes
Central American and Caribbean Games medalists in athletics
Medalists at the 1963 Pan American Games